Charles Edward Sands (December 22, 1865 – August 9, 1945) was an American golfer, tennis and real tennis player who competed in the 1900 Summer Olympics and in the 1908 Summer Olympics.

Education 
Sands was educated at Columbia College, where he played tennis and golf, and graduated in 1887. He was posthumously inducted into the Athletics Hall of Fame in 2018.

Sports career
In 1900 he won the gold medal in the men's individual golf competition.

Sands also participated as tennis player at the 1900 Olympics.  In the singles tournament he was eliminated in the first round. He and his British partner Archibald Warden were also eliminated in the first round of the doubles event. Also the mixed doubles competition ended for him and his partner Georgina Jones after the first round.

Eight years later he was again eliminated in the first round this time from the real tennis tournament.

References

External links

Profile

19th-century American people
19th-century male tennis players
Amateur golfers
American male golfers
American male tennis players
American real tennis players
Columbia Lions men's golfers
Columbia Lions men's tennis players
Golfers at the 1900 Summer Olympics
Jeu de paume players at the 1908 Summer Olympics
Medalists at the 1900 Summer Olympics
Olympic gold medalists for the United States in golf
Olympic real tennis players of the United States
Olympic tennis players of the United States
Tennis people from New York (state)
Tennis players at the 1900 Summer Olympics
1865 births
1945 deaths